Unfinished Business is a 1984 Canadian drama film directed by Don Owen. It is a sequel to Owen's influential 1964 film Nobody Waved Goodbye.

The film stars Peter Kastner and Julie Biggs as Peter and Julie, the protagonists of the original film. Having married and settled down into adulthood following Julie's pregnancy in the original film, they have since divorced but are now coping with the emerging rebelliousness of their now 17-year-old daughter Izzy (Isabelle Mejias). The cast also includes Peter Spence, Chuck Shamata, Melleny Brown and Ann-Marie MacDonald. CBC journalist Ann Medina played a reporter.

Cast
 Isabelle Mejias as Isabelle Marks
 Peter Spence as Jessie 'Fixit'
 Leslie Toth as Matthew
 Julie Biggs as Julie Marks
 Jane Foster as Jackie
 Melleny Melody as Larissa / Larry (credited as Melleny Brown)
 Chuck Shamata as Carl
 Peter Kastner as Peter Marks
 Ann-Marie MacDonald as Paula
 Ann Medina as TV Announcer / Newscaster
 Marc Gomes as Cecil

Nominations
The film garnered five Genie Award nominations at the 6th Genie Awards in 1985:
Best Actress: Isabelle Mejias
Best Supporting Actor: Peter Spence 
 Best Director: Don Owen
 Best Screenplay: Don Owen
 Best Cinematography: Douglas Kiefer

References

External links 
 

1984 films
Canadian drama films
Canadian sequel films
English-language Canadian films
Films directed by Don Owen
1980s English-language films
1980s Canadian films